Sinumelon is a genus of air-breathing land snails, terrestrial pulmonate gastropod mollusks in the family Camaenidae. Sinumelon is the type genus of the subfamily Sinumeloninae.

Species 
Species within the genus Sinumelon include:
 Sinumelon bednalli

References 

 
Camaenidae
Taxonomy articles created by Polbot